Zinowiewia costaricensis is a species of tree in the family Celastraceae. It is found in Belize, Costa Rica, Nicaragua, and Panama. It is threatened by habitat loss. The plant is used medicinally.

Trees grow up to 13 meters. It has very small, round flowers with five petals. It flowers in March and April. Its fruits have one or two seeds, whereas all other Zinoweiwia species have only one seed. The leaves are also smaller than other species.

References

costaricensis
Flora of Central America
Near threatened plants
Taxonomy articles created by Polbot